The Godwin Heights Public Schools is a public school system located in Wyoming, Michigan (U.S.).

History
The Godwin Heights Public Schools system was founded in 1867 by Augustus Godwin, in what was then known as Wyoming Township, Michigan. The school district is located primarily in the city of Wyoming, Michigan, and consists of six buildings; one for administration and five for schools.

Schools

 North Godwin Elementary – 362 students (2021–22)
 West Godwin Elementary – 422 students (2021–22)
 Godwin Heights Middle School – 417 students (2021–22)
 Godwin Heights Learning Center – 71 students (2021–22)
 Godwin Heights High School – 738 students (2021–22)

Demographics
Source: U.S. News & World Report

Ethnicity

Other

References

External links
 

Education in Kent County, Michigan
School districts in Michigan